Sisters of the Precious Blood may refer to:

 Sisters of the Precious Blood (Baden), a Roman Catholic female religious order founded in Gurtweil, Baden, in 1857
 Sisters of the Precious Blood (Switzerland), a Roman Catholic female religious order founded in Grisons, Switzerland, in 1834
 Bernadines of the Precious Blood, a congregation of nuns founded as an offshoot of the reformed Cistercians
 Daughters of the Precious Blood, a congregation of nuns established in the Netherlands in 1862
 Sisters Adorers of the Precious Blood, a congregation of nuns established in Quebec, Canada, in 1861
 Society of the Precious Blood, an Anglican order of Augustinian nuns founded in 1905
 Sisters of the Precious Blood (Monza), a female religious teaching and social congregation founded in Monza, Italy, in 1874